Annie Oakley (born Phoebe Ann Moses; August 13, 1860 – November 3, 1926) was an American sharpshooter who starred in Buffalo Bill's Wild West show.

Oakley developed hunting skills as a child to provide for her impoverished family in western Ohio. At age 15, she won a shooting contest against an experienced marksman, Frank E. Butler, whom she later married in 1876. The pair joined Buffalo Bill in 1885, performing in Europe before royalty and other heads of state. Audiences were astounded to see her shooting out a cigar from her husband's hand or splitting a playing-card edge-on at 30 paces. She earned more than anyone except Buffalo Bill himself.

After a bad rail accident in 1901, she had to settle for a less taxing routine, and she toured in a play written about her career. She also instructed women in marksmanship, believing strongly in female self-defense. Her stage acts were filmed for one of Thomas Edison's earliest Kinetoscopes in 1894. Since her death, her story has been adapted for stage musicals and films, including Annie Get Your Gun.

Early life
There is a stone-mounted plaque in the vicinity of the site, which was placed by the Annie Oakley Committee in 1981, 121 years after her birth.

Annie's parents were Quakers of English descent from Hollidaysburg, Blair County, Pennsylvania: Susan Wise, born 1830, and Jacob Mosey, born 1799, married in 1848. They moved to a rented farm (later purchased with a mortgage) in Patterson Township, Darke County, Ohio, sometime around 1855.

Born in 1860, Annie was the sixth of Jacob and Susan's nine children, and the fifth of the seven surviving. Her siblings were Mary Jane (1851–1867), Lydia (1852–1882), Elizabeth (1855–1881), Sarah Ellen (1857–1939), Catherine (1859–1859), John (1861–1949), Hulda (1864–1934) and a stillborn infant brother in 1865. Annie's father, who had fought in the War of 1812, was 61 years old at the time of Annie's birth and became invalid from hypothermia during a blizzard in late 1865 and died of pneumonia in early 1866 at age 66. Her mother later married Daniel Brumbaugh, had another daughter, Emily (1868–1937), and was widowed once again.

Because of poverty following her father's death, Annie did not regularly attend school as a child, although she did attend later in childhood and in adulthood. On March 15, 1870, at age nine, she was admitted to the Darke County Infirmary along with her sister Sarah Ellen. According to her autobiography, she was put in the care of the infirmary's superintendent, Samuel Crawford Edington, and his wife Nancy, who taught her to sew and decorate. Beginning in the spring of 1870, she was "bound out" to a local family to help care for their infant son, on the false promise of fifty cents per week and an education. The couple had originally wanted someone who could pump water, cook, and who was bigger. She spent about two years in near slavery to them, enduring mental and physical abuse. One time, the wife put Annie out in the freezing cold without shoes, as a punishment because she had fallen asleep over some darning. Annie referred to them as "the wolves". Even in her autobiography, she never revealed the couple's real names.

According to biographer Glenda Riley, "the wolves" could have been the Studabaker family, but the 1870 U.S. Census suggests they were the Abram Boose family of neighboring Preble County. Around the spring of 1872, Annie ran away from "the wolves". According to biographer Shirl Kasper, it was only at this point that Annie met and lived with the Edingtons, returning to her mother's home around the age of 15.

Annie began trapping before the age of seven, and shooting and hunting by age eight, to support her siblings and her widowed mother. She sold the hunted game to locals in Greenville, such as shopkeepers Charles and G. Anthony Katzenberger, who shipped it to hotels in Cincinnati and other cities. She also sold the game to restaurants and hotels in northern Ohio. Her skill paid off the mortgage on her mother's farm when Annie was 15.

Debut and marriage

Annie soon became well known throughout the region. On Thanksgiving Day 1875, the Baughman & Butler shooting act was being performed in Cincinnati. Traveling show marksman and former dog trainer Frank E. Butler (1847–1926), an Irish immigrant, placed a $100 bet per side with Cincinnati hotel owner Jack Frost that Butler could beat any local fancy shooter. The hotelier arranged a shooting match between Butler and the 15-year-old Annie, saying, "The last opponent Butler expected was a  15-year-old girl named Annie." After missing on his 25th shot, Butler lost the match and the bet. Another account says that Butler hit on his last shot, but the bird fell dead about  beyond the boundary line. He soon began courting Annie and they married. They did not have children.

According to a modern-day account in The Cincinnati Enquirer, it is possible that the shooting match took place in 1881 and not 1875. It appears the time of the event was never recorded. Biographer Shirl Kasper states the shooting match took place in the spring of 1881 near Greenville, possibly in North Star as mentioned by Butler during interviews in 1903 and 1924. Other sources seem to coincide with the North Fairmount location near Cincinnati if the event occurred in 1881. The Annie Oakley Center Foundation mentions Oakley visiting her married sister Lydia Stein at her home near Cincinnati in 1875. That information is incorrect as Lydia did not marry Joseph C. Stein until March 19, 1877. Although speculation, it is most likely that Oakley and her mother visited Lydia in 1881 as she was seriously ill from tuberculosis. The Bevis House hotel was still being operated by Martin Bevis and W. H. Ridenour in 1875. It opened around 1860 after the building was previously used as a pork packaging facility. Jack Frost did not obtain management of the hotel until 1879. The Baughman & Butler shooting act first appeared on the pages of The Cincinnati Enquirer in 1880. They signed with Sells Brothers Circus in 1881 and made an appearance at the Coliseum Opera House later that year.

Regardless of the actual date of the shooting match, Oakley and Butler were married a year afterward. A certificate on file with the Archives of Ontario, Registration Number 49594, reports that Butler and Oakley were wed on June 20, 1882, in Windsor, Ontario. Many sources say the marriage took place on August 23, 1876, in Cincinnati, but no recorded certificate validates that date. A possible reason for the contradictory dates is that Butler's divorce from his first wife, Henrietta Saunders, was not yet final in 1876. An 1880 U.S. Federal Census record shows Saunders as married. Sources mentioning Butler's first wife as Elizabeth are inaccurate; Elizabeth was his granddaughter, her father being Edward F. Butler. Throughout Oakley's show-business career, the public was often led to believe that she was five to six years younger than she was. The later marriage date would have better supported her fictional age.

Career and touring

Annie and Frank Butler lived in Cincinnati for a time. Oakley, the stage name she adopted when she and Frank began performing together, is believed to have been taken from the city's neighborhood of Oakley, where they resided. Some people believe she took on the name because that was the name of the man who had paid her train fare when she was a child.

They joined Buffalo Bill's Wild West in 1885. At five feet tall, Oakley was given the nickname of "Watanya Cicilla" by fellow performer Sitting Bull, rendered "Little Sure Shot" in the public advertisements.

During her first engagement with the Buffalo Bill show, Oakley experienced a tense professional rivalry with rifle sharpshooter Lillian Smith. Smith was eleven years younger than Oakley, age 15 at the time she joined the show in 1886, which may have been a primary reason for Oakley to alter her actual age in later years due to Smith's press coverage becoming as favorable as hers. Oakley temporarily left the Buffalo Bill show but returned two years later, after Smith departed, in time for the Paris Exposition of 1889. This three-year tour only cemented Oakley as America's first female star. She earned more than any other performer in the show, except for Buffalo Bill himself. She also performed in many shows on the side for extra income.

In Europe, she performed for Queen Victoria of the United Kingdom, King Umberto I of Italy, President Marie François Sadi Carnot of France and other crowned heads of state. Oakley supposedly shot the ashes off a cigarette held by the newly crowned German Kaiser Wilhelm II at his request.

From 1892 to 1904, Oakley and Butler made their home in Nutley, New Jersey.

Oakley promoted the service of women in combat operations for the United States armed forces. She wrote a letter to President William McKinley on April 5, 1898, "offering the government the services of a company of 50 'lady sharpshooters' who would provide their own arms and ammunition should the U.S. go to war with Spain."

The Spanish–American War did occur, but Oakley's offer was not accepted. Theodore Roosevelt, did, however, name his volunteer cavalry the "Rough Riders" after the "Buffalo Bill's Wild West and Congress of Rough Riders of the World" where Oakley was a major star.

In 1901 (the same year as McKinley's assassination), Oakley was badly injured in a train accident but recovered after temporary paralysis and five spinal operations. She left the Buffalo Bill show and in 1902 began a less taxing acting career in a stage play written especially for her, The Western Girl. Oakley played the role of Nancy Berry who used a pistol, a rifle and rope to outsmart a group of outlaws.

Throughout her career, it is believed that Oakley taught more than 15,000 women how to use a gun. Oakley believed strongly that it was crucial for women to learn how to use a gun, as not only a form of physical and mental exercise, but also to defend themselves. She said: "I would like to see every woman know how to handle guns, as naturally as they know how to handle babies."

The Little Sure Shot of the Wild West (Annie Oakley) 

Buffalo Bill was friends with Thomas Edison, and Edison built the world's largest electrical power plant at the time for the Wild West Show. Buffalo Bill and 15 of his show Indians appeared in two Kinetoscopes filmed September 24, 1894.

In 1894, Oakley and Butler performed in Edison's Kinetoscope film "Little Sure Shot" of the "Wild West", an exhibition of rifle shooting at stationary and moving objects, which was filmed November 1, 1894, in Edison's Black Maria studio by William Heise. It lasted 21 seconds at 30 frames and 39 feet. It was the eleventh film made after commercial showings began on April 14, 1894.

Shooting prowess

Biographers, such as Shirl Kasper, repeat Oakley's own story about her very first shot at the age of eight. "I saw a squirrel run down over the grass in front of the house, through the orchard and stop on a fence to get a hickory nut." Taking a rifle from the house, she fired at the squirrel, writing later that, "It was a wonderful shot, going right through the head from side to side".
The Encyclopædia Britannica notes that:Oakley never failed to delight her audiences, and her feats of marksmanship were truly incredible. At 30 paces she could split a playing card held edge-on, she hit dimes tossed into the air, she shot cigarettes from her husband's lips, and, a playing card being thrown into the air, she riddled it before it touched the ground.

R. A. Koestler-Grack reports that, on March 19, 1884, she was being watched by Chief Sitting Bull when:Oakley playfully skipped on stage, lifted her rifle, and aimed the barrel at a burning candle. In one shot, she snuffed out the flame with a whizzing bullet. Sitting Bull watched her knock corks off of bottles and slice through a cigar Butler held in his teeth.

Association with Sitting Bull 
Oakley and Sitting Bull purportedly met and bonded while working together on a Buffalo Bill show in Minnesota. Sitting Bull joined with Buffalo Bill after being paroled, having led the last major Indian uprising against the federal government; his status as a great warrior and leader was legendary worldwide by the time he and Oakley met. The former Indian Chief was so impressed with Oakley's skills that he offered $65 (equal to $ today) for a photograph of him and her together. According to Oakley, the admiration and respect was mutual and only increased as they spent more time together.  Sitting Bull felt Oakley must be "gifted" by supernatural means, in order to shoot so accurately with both hands. As a result of his esteem, Sitting Bull symbolically "adopted" Oakley as his daughter in 1884, naming her "Little Sure Shot" – a title that Oakley went on to use throughout her career.

Libel cases 
In 1904, sensational cocaine prohibition stories were selling well. Newspaper magnate William Randolph Hearst published a false story that Oakley had been arrested for stealing to support a cocaine habit. The woman actually arrested was a burlesque performer who told Chicago police that her name was Annie Oakley.

Most of the newspapers that printed the story had relied on the Hearst article, and they immediately retracted it with apologies upon learning of the libelous error. Hearst, however, tried to avoid paying the anticipated court judgments of $20,000 by sending an investigator to Darke County, Ohio, with the intent of collecting reputation-smearing gossip from Oakley's past. The investigator found nothing.

Oakley spent much of the next six years winning all but one of her 55 libel lawsuits against newspapers. She collected less in judgments than the total of her legal expenses.

Later years and death 

In 1913, the Butlers built a brick bungalow style home in Cambridge, Maryland. It is known as the Annie Oakley House and was listed on the National Register of Historic Places in 1996. In 1917, they moved to North Carolina and returned to public life.

Oakley continued to set records into her sixties and also engaged in extensive philanthropy for women's rights and other causes, including the support of young women she knew. She embarked on a comeback and intended to star in a feature-length silent movie.

In late 1922, the couple were in a car accident that forced Oakley to wear a steel brace on her right leg. She eventually performed again after more than a year of recovery, and she set records in 1924.

Oakley's health declined in 1925 and she died of pernicious anemia in Greenville, Ohio, at the age of 66 on November 3, 1926. She was cremated and her ashes buried at Brock Cemetery, near Greenville.

According to B. Haugen, Butler was so grieved by Oakley's death that he stopped eating and died 18 days later in Michigan; he was buried next to her ashes. Kasper reports that Butler's death certificate gave "senility" as the cause of death. One rumor claims that Oakley's ashes were placed in one of her trophies and placed with Butler's body in his coffin prior. Both body and ashes were interred in the cemetery on Thanksgiving Day, November 25, 1926.

After her death, her incomplete autobiography was given to stage comedian Fred Stone, and it was discovered that her entire fortune had been spent on her family and her charities.

A vast collection of Oakley's personal possessions, performance memorabilia, and firearms are on permanent exhibit in the Garst Museum and the National Annie Oakley Center in Greenville, Ohio. She has been inducted into the Trapshooting Hall of Fame, the National Cowgirl Museum and Hall of Fame in Fort Worth, Texas, the National Women's Hall of Fame, the Ohio Women's Hall of Fame, and the New Jersey Hall of Fame.

Surname 
There are a number of variations given for Oakley's family name, Mosey. Many biographers and other references give the name as "Moses". Although the 1860 U.S. Census shows the family name as "Mauzy", this is considered an error introduced by the census taker. Oakley's name appears as "Ann Mosey" in the 1870 U.S. Census and "Mosey" is engraved on her father's headstone and appears in his military record; "Mosey" is the official spelling by the Annie Oakley Foundation, maintained by her living relatives. The spelling "Mosie" has also appeared.

According to Kasper, Oakley insisted that her family name be spelled "Mozee", leading to arguments with her brother John. Kasper speculates that Oakley may have considered "Mozee" to be a more phonetic spelling. There is also popular speculation that young Oakley had been teased about her name by other children.

Prior to their double wedding in March 1884, both Oakley's brother John and one of her sisters, Hulda, changed their surnames to "Moses".

Eponym 
During her lifetime, the theatre business began referring to complimentary tickets as "Annie Oakleys". Such tickets traditionally have holes punched into them (to prevent them from being resold), reminiscent of the playing cards Oakley shot through during her sharpshooting act.

Depictions in arts and entertainment 

 Barbara Stanwyck played Oakley in the film Annie Oakley (1935).
 The Irving Berlin Broadway musical Annie Get Your Gun (1946) is loosely based on her life. The original stage production starred Ethel Merman, who also starred in the 1966 revival.
 The 1950 film version of the musical starred Betty Hutton and Howard Keel.
 Several years after headlining the 1948 national tour, Mary Martin returned to the role for a 1957 NBC television special that also featured John Raitt as Frank Butler.
 Gail Davis played a fictionalized version of Oakley in the television series Annie Oakley (1954 to 1956).
 Geraldine Chaplin portrayed Oakley in Buffalo Bill and the Indians, or Sitting Bull's History Lesson (1976).
 Jamie Lee Curtis portrayed Oakley in Tall Tales & Legends (1985).
 Reba McEntire portrayed Oakley in Buffalo Girls (1996), alongside Anjelica Huston and Melanie Griffith. She later replaced Bernadette Peters in the title role for the 1999 Broadway revival of Annie Get Your Gun alongside Tom Wopat.
 Elizabeth Berridge portrayed Oakley in Hidalgo (2004).
 Alyssa Edwards portrayed Oakley in RuPaul's Drag Race All Stars season 2 (2016), episode 3: "HERstory Of The World".
 The Andy Pratt song "Avenging Annie" tells a story about Annie Oakley meeting Pretty Boy Floyd.
 Author Kari Bovée published a trilogy of Annie Oakley historical mystery novels in 2020.
 Oakley appears as the main character in the historical crime fiction story Sureshot, set during the aftermath of the 1901 train crash, published in the collection Crimeucopia 'Say What Now'.
 Marvel Comics' predecessors Timely Comics and Atlas Comics published an Annie Oakley comic book for eleven issues from Spring 1948 to June 1956.

Influence
Oakley's worldwide stardom as a sharpshooter enabled her to earn more money than most of the other performers in the Buffalo Bill show. She did not forget her roots after gaining financial and economic power. She and Butler together often donated to charitable organizations for orphans. Beyond her monetary influence, she proved to be a great influence on women.

Oakley urged that women serve in war, though President William McKinley rejected her offer of woman sharpshooters for service in the Spanish–American War. Beyond this offer to the president, Oakley believed that women should learn to use a gun for the empowering image that it gave. Laura Browder discusses how Oakley's stardom gave hope to women and youth in Her Best Shot: Women and Guns In America. Oakley pressed for women to be independent and educated. She was a key influence in the creation of the image of the American cowgirl. Through this image, she provided substantial evidence that women are as capable as men when offered the opportunity to prove themselves.

See also
 Belle Starr
 Buffalo Bill
 Calamity Jane
 Lillian Smith
 Women in the military

References

Further reading

External links

 
 
 Annie Oakley - Biography by Dorchester County Public Library, Cambridge, MD
 Annie Oakley Center Foundation frequently asked questions about Annie Oakley
 American Experience | Annie Oakley | People & Events | PBS
 "Little Miss Sure Shot"The Saga of Annie Oakley
 Scanned 1898 letter from Anne Oakley to President McKinley advocating the use of women in military combat (from the National Archives and Records Administration)
 

1860 births
1926 deaths
19th-century American people
20th-century American people
19th-century American women
20th-century American women
American autobiographers
American entertainers
American folklore
American stunt performers
Cowgirl Hall of Fame inductees
Gunslingers of the American Old West
Sharpshooters
Wild West show performers
Women autobiographers
American people of English descent
People from Darke County, Ohio
Deaths from pernicious anemia
Burials in Ohio
Articles containing video clips